Cereté is a town and municipality located in the Córdoba Department, northern Colombia.

Name origin

Cereté comes from the two indigenous words meaning Chere (fish) and te (shelter).

History

Cereté is one of the oldest administrative divisions in the Sinú Region, founded in 1721 by Spanish Francisco Velásquez and Cristóbal Jiménez de León. In 1731 the curate of Cereté-Mocarí was given to jesuits who were in the process of evangelizing local indigenous peoples. The settlement of Cereté was not officially established until 1740 when Juan de Torrezal Díaz Pimienta reorganized the settlement into a village.

Geography and climate

The municipality of Cereté borders to the north with the municipality of San Pelayo, the municipalities of Ciénaga de Oro and San Carlos to the east, the municipalities of San Carlos and Montería to the south and to the west again with the municipalities of San Pelayo and Montería covering a total area of 351.8 km². Cereté has a yearly average temperature of 28 °C and is some 12 m over sea level. The town of Cereté is located some 18 km from the Cordoba Department capital Montería.

The town of Cereté is crossed by the Caño Bugre (Bugre Stream) an affluent of the Sinú River. The Bugre stream was once navigable and connected the town with other river towns like Puerto Wilches and San Pelayo.

Economy
The economy of Cereté is based primarily in cattle raising with some 270 km² used and agriculture with extensive cultivations of cotton (colloquially known as the "white gold") and sorghum covering an area of 80 km².

References

 Alcaldía Municipal de Cereté
 El Espacio; Cerete
 El Meridiano de Cordiba; Cerete

Cordoba